The Killian Curse is a New Zealand kidult horror-fantasy television show, directed by Thomas Robins and Wayne Vinton. Starring Nick Blake and local New Zealand children, The Killian Curse tells the 21 stories of the students from Room 21, who must each face an evil curse placed on them by the sinister Charles Killian. Killian wants to get revenge on the people who caused his death shortly after founding the school in 1906. He needs to capture eleven souls to rise from the dead. There are two series which first aired in 2006 and 2008.

Premise
1906 Room 21 Students

The original students of Room 21 are caught doing a ritual led by Killian. The parents banished him, but a fire broke out during a struggle which eventually burned the interior of the classroom, killing Killian in the process. Before dying, he swore to get revenge by stealing the eleven souls needed to return from the dead. Killian also said that parents would be blind to the suffering of their children. It is only the other classmates of Room 21 who can see what is happening. One of the kids from present day Room 21 (and narrator of the events of 1906) happens to be the great, great grandson of the man directly responsible for Killian's death. The great, great grandfather and the others in the room at the time of Killian's death are presumed to be ancestors of the current kids in room 21. Shortly after, the room is sealed "forever", forever lasting until 2006, when the story begins. Some people who have watched it have been paranoid by the number 21 and have been seeing it quite a lot of times.

2006 Room 21 Students

After 100 years, Room 21 is unsealed by a principal who does not believe in curses and it is up to the school janitor to tell the students about the curse. Some are skeptical until the first victim is taken. Filmed 2005–2006.

2008 (set in 2007) Room 21 Students

It has been a year and the last year students of Room 21 still got called out into the Room 21 Class. They all got their souls back but some were repossessed. Those students are stuck in Killian's World/Lair. On Earth they're zombies but to adults they are just normal. This series was filmed in 2007.

Cast of series one and two

Reoccurring adults
Charles Killian – Nick Blake
Mr Timmins – Paul Yates
Miss Pritchard – Tanea Heke
Mr Elder – Grant Roa
Miss Ryder – Holly Shanahan

Other characters
Eddie Lockhart – Rafe Custance Katie Lockhart's brother.
Troy – Johnny Hurn A basketball player who is a friend of Te Aroha.

Kids of Room 21
All the kids in the cast are local tweens and teenagers from New Zealand. From the time of shooting the first series, the oldest was 16 (Ivana Palezevic, Tabatha) and the youngest was 11 (Georgia Fabish, Celia). All the kids appear in both series apart from Chelsea (Series 1) and Billie (Series 2).

The kids in character alphabetical order;

Billie Anderson – Brooke Paske (Second series only) New exchange student in Room 21. Takes over Chelsea's place by having a similar personality and traits as Chelsea.
Byron Turner – Tim Radich A skater boy. Does not listen and often takes risks.
Celia West – Georgia Fabish A nerdy girl. Loves bugs and books. She is the reason everyone regained their souls in the first series.
Charlotte Brunton – Grace MacDonald The class' "mean girl", very empowering. Has a secret love of china dolls.
Chelsea Regans – Priyanka Xi (First series only) Snotty, stuck-up girl. Bullies Celia by saying she has an 'ugly curse'.
David White – Max Blake-Persen The first to be taken by the curse. Not much else is known about him.
Elizabeth Ratana – Jacinta Wawatai A hydrophobic girl who enjoys Kendo fighting. Te Aroha's best friend.
Haley Bloomsfield – Zoë Robins Gullible, can be too nice and over committed.
Jack Williams – Cameron Wakefield His great-great grandfather triggered the start of the curse. He always looks out for everyone in the class and finds a way to talk to the class from Killian's world in series 2.
Jen de Jong – Felicity Milovanovich Shown to like sports in the first series. She appears to have a crush on Byron in Series 2.
Johnny Campbell – Thomas Williams The class joker. He provides comic relief in dire situations.
Karen Smyth – Frith Horan Lucy's ex-best friend. Has a crush on Will.
Karl Bennett – Sharn Te Pou Believed there was no way to beat the curse in Series 1. Slightly selfish.
Katie Lockhart – Beth Chote The class goth girl. Appears to also have a crush on Byron.
Keith Wilson/Donaldson – James Shaw Bully turned nice, cares about everyone's safety.
Lucy Myers – Liffey Jacobson-Wright A girl with phone addiction. Was Karen's best friend, but they fell out.
Miles Delany – Brayden Muir-Mills Pessimistic, not very encouraging. Often humiliates Will.
Owen Jameson/Slater – James Croft A computer geek. Always seen with gaming console.
Shane Arnold – Riley Brophy Often described as a 'geek'. Was a victim of Keith's bullying in Series 1.
Tabetha Simpson – Ivana Palezevic A girl who wants to be a director. Tries to be positive.
Te Aroha Pene (TP) – Greer Samuel The sportiest in the class. Elizabeth's best friend.
Will Taylor – Andrew Hampton A boy who wants to be a movie star. Appears to have a crush on Karen in Series 2.

Series one
The first series was initially screened in New Zealand on 21 July 2006 on TV2.

The Beginning/Possessor/Warlock
David – A janitor attempts to warn the class about Killian's curse, but David, as usual, leaves the classroom early. They heard a scream and when the whole class found David, his soul was taken, starting the curse. The appearance of the number 21 was when it was found written above the classroom door.

Celia – She was being followed by a demon who was attempting to possess her, in turn taking her soul. She defeated it by trapping it within the body of her pet cockroach then crushing it. The number 21 appeared when Mr. Timmins wrote the number on the blackboard after Celia answered a maths question he asked.

Johnny – He was taken to hospital when his bike crashed which he was chased by an ambulance who turns out to be a warlock who wants his fat. The warlock was killed when Johnny stabbed him with a fat injecting needle and the warlock blows up. The appearance of the number 21 when Johnny rode past a letter box with the number written on it.

Water/Phone/Werewolf
Elizabeth – A kraken hid in the school's pipe system, so she followed it to the old swimming pool. She unplugged the drain in an attempt to defeat it but she was taken. She was eventually returned. The number "21" was found written on a cubicle door.

Lucy – She had a poltergeist in her phone. It tried to "download" her to get her soul. The phone was sending Lucy's soul to Karen's phone. Lucy beat her curse by putting Karen's phone in the microwave. The number 21 appeared when the brochure advertising the mobile phone said "JUST TEXT 21".

Owen – His curse was a werewolf whom he tries to defeat by locking it out but a teacher pushes him outside and the wolf claimed his soul but he eventually returned. The number 21 appeared as read on the calendar in the teacher's office. This Episode features Jed Brophy as the Werewolf.

Zombies/Witch/Domicile
Karen – She was in a grocery store when she was attacked by zombies but defeated them by trapping them in an oven. The number 21 was mentioned when Karen paid 21 dollars for chocolate bars.

Charlotte – When Charlotte goes over the fence of an old house to return her necklace that was thrown over by a bully, a cat took it inside the house. Despite warnings from Jen and Celia, Charlotte went after it. She found it but its owner, a witch, took her soul before she got out. She was returned. The number "21" was carved on the fence outside the old house.

Katie – She went to her uncle's place during the weekend with her father and brother. She was attacked by a demon called Haki who can enter anything. Her soul was taken when she mistook it for their neighbour. The number 21 was seen on a painting of demons.

Dream/Energy/Wendigo
Miles – He was forced to fight an alien caused by his curse. Will thought that it was his curse and escaped, however Miles was left behind therefore his soul was taken. The curse was triggered when Miles had watched 21 seconds of Will's humiliating performance.

Te Aroha "TP" – She was forced to compete against a demon in a basketball game. She defeated the demon by ripping its head off and throwing it in a waste paper basket. The curse was triggered when she bumped into a basketball player wearing the number "21".

Karl – He once doubted that there is a way to defeat the curse, but with the help of Jack he defeats a Wendigo. The number 21 manifested as a carving on a tree where Karl and Jack both ride past it.

Voodoo/Mummy/Shadows
Will – In an attempt to cause Keith some pain, Karen sets up a voodoo doll that ends up affecting Will instead. It was overcome by hiding the doll in a tin with air holes where no one will find it. The number 21 appeared when it was "accidentally" written in Will's blood on the doll.

Shane – On a school field trip Shane is attacked by a mummy. Shane tried to defeat it by removing its bandages but it was still invisible on the inside. He was taken. Killian set Shane 21 minutes to avoid the mummy.

Jen – Jen was attacked by a shadow demon that could manipulate the real world by moving objects' shadows. It managed to claim Jen's soul just before being destroyed by a T-rex doll. The number 21 manifested as a shadow formed by a toy swan's neck and a candle on Jen's bedroom wall.

Vanity/Future/Vampires
Chelsea – A vanity curse made her fall apart, but it was defeated by allowing people to look at her. "21 kisses FREE!" was found written on a magazine Chelsea was reading in class.

Keith – His future self came to get his soul and called Keith hopeless, but he went on to prove his future self wrong. The number appeared when Keith recorded his 21st day waging school.

Haley – A vampire attacked her in a blood bus. She was defeated, but eventually returned. This episode features Nathaniel Lees as Haley's demon, Mr James. The number 21 appeared when the vampire, disguised as a blood donor, offered Haley biscuits and said that she had been "so helpful, she could take... 21"

Car/Drama/Finale
Byron – He tried to escape a car demon by attempting to jump the gap across an unfinished bridge. He missed and was only just hanging on when Killian showed up. Killian gave him two choices: either he would let go and fall into a garbage truck, and he will be free if he survives, or Killian could let him up but take his soul. Byron chose the former but Killian pushed the garbage heap and caught Byron and took his soul. Byron's soul was eventually was returned. "21" manifested on the demonic car's license plate.

Tabetha – She decided to make a school play about the curse. Killian summoned the ghost of the ex-drama teacher so he could get her soul but decided to take part in the play first. During the play Tabetha set up an exorcism and banished the ghost back to the spirit world. The number "21" was found on a flood light which fell onto the ground.

Jack – His soul was taken by Killian, but he was returned with the others taken. The surviving students realised that the curse could be undone by smashing a gravestone which bore the names of the students Killian had taken. After a name was smashed off that person's soul was returned and they were returned to the classroom (Room 21). After Killian's defeat, the students leave the school triumphant and ready to tackle another year at Killian High. Killian was not actually defeated.

Series two
The second series began screening in New Zealand on 8 or 9 February (different sources say different things), 2008 on TV2.

Mechanical Demon/Giant Moth
It starts with the pupils of room 21 having an "apoplectic vision" of Killian destroying Killian High whilst in the first assembly. Jack challenges Killian, saying it is just a dream but is overpowered. Killian then says that they will all be experiencing the curse for another year, with one of them helping him. They all reawaken to be placed back in room 21. The Principal also has them sign a contract to say that they will not talk of the curse for that year before introducing Billie, an exchange student from America who is automatically under suspicion. Jack puts in a buddy system so that Killian will not get anyone on their own.

Byron – Byron is challenged by Killian and a Mechanical Demon to a skateboarding challenge for his soul. They use Jen as a motivator by locking her in a cage. While she escaped, he was taken. "21" was found on a dollar sign tag.

Celia and Jack – She attempts to defeat a giant moth demon by getting all the kids in Room 21 to attack it, but the traitor turns on a torch in Celia's eyes and the moth takes Celia's soul. Jack hits it a few times then the traitor turns on the torch again this time in Jack's eyes. Then the moth takes Jack's soul. Owen beats it. Later on Billie comes holding a flashlight and everyone thinks that Billie must be the Traitor. "21" was found on a page on Celia's textbook.

Camping/Virus/Hand
Miles – Room 21 except Shane to go on a school camp, when the same demon (Werewolf Jed Brophy) from Owen's last curse shows up and attacks them. They all split up and trap the wolf, but it was not after Owen. It was after Miles, who was not helping and was back at the camp. They ran back to the camp to find him tied up and his soul taken by the werewolf's wife. Billie showed everyone Karen's hand that had the rope burn because she pulled the rope too tightly when she was fixing her tent at the beginning if the episode. The traitor actually tied him up. "21" was shown on Johnny's digital watch.

Shane – His curse was a computer virus that affected him in the form of living mucus while he was home sick. He defeats it after he clicks 'Destroy virus' on his computer. The traitor is there, trying not to help Shane. "21" was found on the chat screen.

Karen – Continuing from Miles' 2nd curse, her possessed hand forces her to do bad things like hitting other students and destroying a gift from a sister school. She defeats it by pulling it off with a wood vice and dodging it so it flew out the window into a box of charity toys. The traitor locks her in a room but she manages to escape. "21" appeared when it was written on a piece of paper by Karen's possessed hand.

Shrinking/Game/Past
Johnny – His curse is shrinking that at first attributes to his losing weight. He was knocked off a ledge where he is attacked by a larger than normal spider. The curse is defeated when he gets an allergic reaction to a bee sting. "21" was shown on Johnny's drink bottle.

Elizabeth – Her curse was a kendo video game. She and Karl attempted to play but Karl is quickly knocked unconscious, she defeated the oni that was sent after her. In the end, the Traitor attempts to take her soul but fails and retreats.

Te Aroha – Her curse was when she went back in time into the past years of Killian High. She met a spirit that warned her about three 19th-century bullies that Killian had sent. The bullies chased her onto a train where Killian asked her for her ticket, then the train pulled her into the world of lost souls where she saw Jack. The number 21 appeared when TP went past the number on a wall in graffiti.

Necromancer/Voodoo/Immunity
Lucy – Her demon was a medium who was possessed by a necromancer and attacked most of the girls at the library then the demon went to Lucy's house. Karen tried to warn her but it was too late. The girls had set a seance near section "012-021" in the library.

Will – He brought back the voodoo doll from his last curse (when Karen made the voodoo doll of Keith but it ended up affecting Will) because he did not believe it was safe with the Traitor around and knew it still worked. The traitor took the doll, and pulled Will's legs and arm off and put them in the school furnace. Karen managed to save the doll and sew his arms and legs back on. "21" was found on top of The Anti-Killian Meeting door.

David – His curse was on Killian's Island (a nod to Survivor). He is tripped over during the chase for immunity and all the boys blamed him to be the traitor. They voted him out and Killian took his soul. The "credits" for Killian's Island read "Room 21".

Time/Dolls/Magic
Haley – Her curse is when a time demon that can stop time with a clock that can go back or forward to any time by changing the time on it. Haley defeats the demon by snatching the clock from it and turning the time backwards to the time Haley found out about her curse and smashing it. The demon accidentally reveals that the Traitor is a girl. The number 21 was found on an encyclopedia in the library.

Charlotte – Her curse is when her china dolls come to life. First she takes a china doll off a girl and takes it home. The doll starts her curse. She tries to defeat them by smashing them but they shrink her. She wakes up as a doll herself, and another doll pulls her into the house and takes her soul. The number 21 was found on one of Charlotte's rulers.

Karl – His curse was at Shane's house on his birthday when the magician made Karl disappear. He then was taken to a different stage and was forced to perform the art of escapology. He was lifted into the air and dangled above a chainsaw while tied in chains. He had 30 seconds to escape but failed and had his soul removed. The number 21 appeared when the magician changed the track on the CD player to track 21.

Dead Man/Movies/Drawing
Owen – His curse was a dead man under Killian's command, who tries to take his soul during his work experience at a funeral parlor. The dead man nails him into a coffin and tries to put him into a cremation furnace, but he gets his chain and loops it over a bolt on the conveyor. The traitor, however, takes it off, so Owen bangs his coffin off the conveyor, opening it again and defeating his curse. The number 21 was mentioned when he read that the man had died on 21 February 2007.

Tabetha – Her curse was when she was sent into a movie by Killian and had to fight her way past a Hookman-themed demon in a stereotypical horror movie plot. She ran away from the demon into the basement. The demon started to fire shots at her and eventually hit the main circuit board allowing Tabetha to escape and defeat the curse. The number 21 appeared when she sat in seat number 21.

Katie and Keith – Her curse was when she draws a demon taking Keith's soul. The next day it comes true and her classmates get suspicious. When a two-dimensional comic demon started attacking her and gives the headmaster a heart attack, she realises she can control the demon by drawing in her book. Katie then had to shrink the demon, step on him, and burn him alive. 21 was mentioned when Katie's pens rolled together to make 2 and 1.

Reflection Demon
Billie – Billie was the last student to have to face her demon. Hers was a reflection demon that affected the real world. She confronted it in a school bathroom and it tried to take her soul. The rest of the class helped her get away. The traitor is then revealed to be Jen, who was possessed during the first episode. Then everyone whose soul was never taken went through the portal to Killian's world. After that Killian locked them with a Latin Spell and try to take their souls instead of the others, who had escaped, but eventually he disappeared when a giant rabbit (from Karl's curse) pulled him down when he was rising to go to earth and fought him. After they all looked up at the portal as it closed. They were stuck in Killian's world.

Chelsea did not get a curse because she went to live with Billie's family while Billie stayed with her family.

The Traitor
In the new year at Killian High, Killian warned the Room 21 students that there was a traitor among them. Since there was a new girl Billie, everyone thought it was her.

Afterwards the traitor lets go of Byron but said he let go, shone a torch in Celia and Jack's eyes, took Will's Voodoo doll, tripped David over as he was running away from demons on Killian's Island, tried to stop Elizabeth exiting her cursed kendo game, ties up Miles, pushes Johnny off the desk when he shrunk, stealing Elizabeth's phone and then pretending to be Elizabeth before telling Te Aroha to go to the train station, takes off a chain to put Owen through a crematorium, locks the door when Karen is given her "punishment", locks the door of the bathroom and pushes Billie in through the mirror.

Most people in Room 21 are accused of being the traitor, including Karen (because of the rope burn on her hand), Katie (because of her drawing made Keith lose his soul), Tabetha (calling Owen making the dead man find his hiding spot) and David (because he was thought to have taken Will's Voodoo doll) just to name a few. But Billie is normally the one who get the blame for the traitor's actions. If one was to watch closely you can tell it is not her for a number of reasons.

The Traitor always wears a jumper (or something that hides their face), and Billie does not wear a jumper until the last two episodes.
The Traitor drops a scarf in Elizabeth's curse, there is no evidence that Billie owns a scarf (All the kids in the first series wore scarfs).
In Miles' curse, someone is seen running away from the group during their chase in the woods. Their hair is blonde, but it is not curly (like Billie's) and it is plaited. In that situation only Jen and Karen's hair was plaited.
The Traitor has grey socks and proper school shoes (as seen in Will's curse). Billie wears white socks and ballet flats with her uniform until the last two episodes.
Billie's skirt is shorter than the other kids' skirts and shorts. In Will's curse one can see the back of the traitor. Their skirt/shorts are down to just above the knee.

In the final episode the traitor was revealed to be Jen, although she was being controlled by a demon (that possessed her on the first episode, when she disappeared while with Byron) who would take her soul for themself instead of Killian having it. In the end when they defeated Killian with the demon from Karl's curse, the Rabbit, the whole of Room 21 was stuck in Killian's world even though he was defeated. It still looked as if they had their souls taken out as they could not get out as the portal closed. It looks like 10 of the 11 students of Room 21 will never get out.

Home release
The DVD release of The Killian Curse was due to have been around a week after the final episode was broadcast, but was delayed for unknown reasons. It was eventually released on 14 December 2006.

The DVD differs from the broadcast version, as it is shown in 16:9 widescreen whereas free-to-air New Zealand television (as well as some of the pay TV channels) still broadcast in standard 4:3 format. There is currently no DVD of the second series.

Awards
The Killian Curse won "Achievement in Sound Design in General Television" at the Qantas Film and Television Awards 2008..It was nominated for "Best Children's Programme" at the Air New Zealand Screen Awards 2007.

References

External links

Killian Curse website

2000s New Zealand television series
2006 New Zealand television series debuts
2008 New Zealand television series endings
New Zealand children's television series
New Zealand fantasy television series
Television shows funded by NZ on Air
TVNZ 2 original programming